Tamlaght was a level crossing halt on the Derry Central Railway which ran from Magherafelt to Macfin Junction in Northern Ireland.

History

The station was opened by the Northern Counties Committee on 1 May 1917.

Both station and line were closed by the Ulster Transport Authority on 28 August 1950.

References 

Disused railway stations in County Londonderry
Railway stations opened in 1917
Railway stations closed in 1950
Railway stations in Northern Ireland opened in the 20th century